Phoratopus remex is a species of isopod crustaceans known from only two specimens, and first described in 1925 by Herbert Matthew Hale (1895–1963). It lives on the continental shelf at Encounter Bay and Fowlers Bay, South Australia. It is so unlike all other isopods that it is placed in its own family, Phoratopodidae and suborder, Phoratopidea.

References

Isopod genera
Monotypic crustacean genera
Crustaceans of Australia
Fauna of South Australia